The 2020 Northwestern Wildcats football team represented Northwestern University during the 2020 NCAA Division I FBS football season. The Wildcats played their home games at Ryan Field in Evanston, Illinois, and competed in the West Division of the Big Ten Conference. They were led by 15th-year head coach Pat Fitzgerald.

On August 11, 2020, the Big Ten Conference canceled all fall sports competitions due to the COVID-19 pandemic. However, on September 16, the Big Ten reinstated the season, announcing an eight-game season beginning on October 24.

Previous season
The Wildcats finished the 2019 season 3–9, 1–8 in Big Ten play to finish in last place in the West Division.

Schedule
Northwestern had games scheduled against Tulane, Central Michigan, and Morgan State, but canceled these games on July 9 due to the Big Ten Conference's decision to play a conference-only schedule due to the COVID-19 pandemic.

Rankings

Game summaries

Maryland

at Iowa

Nebraska

at Purdue

Wisconsin

at Michigan State

at Minnesota (Cancelled)

Illinois

vs. Ohio State

vs. Auburn

Players drafted into the NFL

Undrafted players 

Source:

References

Northwestern
Northwestern Wildcats football seasons
Citrus Bowl champion seasons
Northwestern Wildcats football